Jay Vejay is a 1977 Indian Hindi-language action film, produced and directed by L. V. Prasad under the Prasad Productions Pvt. Ltd. banner. It stars Jeetendra, Reena Roy, Bindiya Goswami and Prem Krishan, with music composed by Rajesh Roshan. The film is a remake of Telugu film Chikkadu Dorakadu (1967).

Plot
Once upon a time, there were three kingdoms Malwa, Pushpapuri, & Panchala which conjointly hid a secret treasure, centuries ago, and its route map is secured in 3 different lockets. Generations pass, and now Malwa King Dharam Singh  leads a delightful life with his queen and two princes Jay & Vijay. Suddenly, his vicious chief-minister Maan Singh backstabs him by mingling with a dreadful dacoit Shamsher Jung, and captures the fort. During that plight, Dharam Singh entrusts the princes to his allegiant Shambu, and his wife Nandini, and they split. Jay is reared by a thief Daku Bhavani Singh whereas Vijay is raised by Suber Jung chief commander of Shamsher Jung. However, Shambu & Nandini always fasten them. Years roll by, Shamsher Jung passes away and his hideous son Diler Jung gains control. Besides, Jay turns into a justice-seeking burglar whereas Vijay becomes the chief commander of Malwa unbeknownst. Hereupon, Diler Jung knows the queen's whereabouts and Vijay seizes her. Nevertheless, she safeguards the locket for which traitors subject her to severe torments. Vijay is unable to bear the unjust revolts when Diler Jung gives him the death penalty but he is rescued by Shambu. On his way, Vijay is acquainted with Panchala Princess Padmavathi  and falls for her. Accordingly, he learns to win her he has get hold of Pushpapuri & Panchala lockets and moves on its hunt. In tandem, Dharam Singh builds an armor team and frees the queen. Meanwhile, Jay makes several naughty thefts at Pushpapuri and crushes Queen Ambika  who gazes at his caliber. Currently, she delegates the challenge to pick up the remaining two lockets. Then, Jay & Vijay move several pawns and check each other. Ultimately, they gain the 3 lockets and fuse when Diler Jung & Maan Singh chases them. All of them proceed towards the treasure. Their birth secret is revealed and conjoined with the parents on the way. At last, they win the treasure and cease the baddies. Finally, the movie ends on a happy note with the marriages of Jay & Ambika and Vijay & Padmavathi.

Cast

Jeetendra as Prince Jay D. Singh/Daku Sardar Sher Singh/Garibon Ka Dost 
Prem Krishen as Prince Vijay D. Singh/Senapati Pratap Singh
Reena Roy as Maharani Ambika 
Bindiya Goswami as Princess Padmavati  
Om Shivpuri as King Dharam Singh
Satyendra Kapoor as Shambu
Urmila Bhatt as Queen of Malwa
Roopesh Kumar as King Diler S. Jung 
Dev Kumar  as Shamsher Jung 
Kamal Kapoor as Mahamantri Maan Singh
Jagdeep as Mangal Singh
Bhagwan as Sher Singh's victim 
Mohan Sherry as Daku Bhavani Singh  
Vikas Anand as Ram Singh
Brahm Bhardwaj as Treasures Guard
Paintal as Damak
Brahmachari as Chamak
Viju Khote as Randhir
Shivraj as Laxmi's Father
Lalita Pawar as Nandini
Sarala Yeolekar	as Bela
Lalita Kumari as Rambha
Jayshree T. as Maneka
Veena as Chandevli

Soundtrack

Trivia

A clip from this film featuring Jeetendra is used in the song "Dhoom Taana" (Om Shanti Om).

External links
 

1977 films
1970s Hindi-language films
1970s historical fantasy films
Films directed by L. V. Prasad
Indian historical fantasy films
Films about royalty
Indian epic films
Indian historical adventure films
Treasure hunt films
1970s historical adventure films
Films scored by Rajesh Roshan
Hindi remakes of Telugu films
Indian swashbuckler films
Indian fantasy action films